Varanodon is an extinct genus of amniotes from the family Varanopidae. It has been found in the Chickasha Formation of Oklahoma, which dates to the Roadian stage of the Middle Permian. The two may represent growth stages of a single animal.

See also
 List of pelycosaurs

References

Varanopids
Prehistoric synapsid genera
Cisuralian synapsids of North America
Taxa named by Everett C. Olson
Fossil taxa described in 1965
Cisuralian genus first appearances
Cisuralian genus extinctions